Stanley Hamilton Atkins (March 8, 1912 – January 6, 1996) was an English prelate of the Episcopal Church, who served as the third Bishop Eau Claire, from 1970 till 1980.

Early life and education
Atkins was born in Newcastle upon Tyne, England, on March 8, 1912, the son of George Thomas Atkins and Ethel Williams. He studied at King's College London and graduated in 1938. He was awarded a Doctor of Divinity from Nashotah House in 1969.

Ordained Ministry
Atkins was ordained deacon on December 18, 1938, and priest on December 17, 1939, and served in the Diocese of Durham. He married Mildred Maureen March on May 5, 1942, and together had three children. In 1949, he left for Canada and served in the Diocese of Rupert's Land in the Anglican Church of Canada. In 1955, he moved to the United States to become rector of St Paul's Church in Hudson, Wisconsin and vicar of St Thomas' Church in New Richmond, Wisconsin. Atkins then became Archdeacon of Milwaukee, in the Episcopal Diocese of Milwaukee, serving from 1962 till 1969.

Bishop
In 1969, Atkins was elected Coadjutor Bishop of Eau Claire, and was consecrated on August 2, 1969, in Christ Church Cathedral, Eau Claire. He succeeded as diocesan bishop on January 1, 1970. He was a leader in the movement opposing women's ordination in the Episcopal Church USA, and served as a trustee of Nashotah House Theological Seminary as well as The Living Church magazine. Atkins retired as diocesan bishop in 1980, and was succeeded by William C. Wantland.

References

The Theological Case Against Women's Ordination by Stanley Atkins

1912 births
1996 deaths
English emigrants to the United States
20th-century American Episcopalians
Episcopal bishops of Eau Claire
20th-century American clergy